The Wasp is a lost 1918 silent film comedy drama directed by Lionel Belmore and starring stage star Kitty Gordon. It was produced by William A. Brady and distributed by World Film Company.

Cast
Kitty Gordon as Grace Culver
Rockliffe Fellowes as Harry Cortland/Tim Purcell
Charles Gerry as John Culver (*note: this may be Charles Cherry)
Zadee Burbank as Mrs. Culver (*as Sadee Burbank)
William Calhoun as Mr. Cortland
Edward Roseman as Jackson Devereaux
Victor Kennard as Kane Putnam
Lionel Belmore as Brazsos
Hazel Washburn as Miller, the Maid
Edmund Burns as Harry's Roommate (*as Edward Burns)

References

External links
 The Wasp at IMDb.com

1918 films
American silent feature films
Lost American films
World Film Company films
American black-and-white films
1918 comedy-drama films
1918 lost films
1910s American films
Lost comedy-drama films
Silent American comedy-drama films
1910s English-language films